The 2008 Cup of China was the third event of six in the 2008–09 ISU Grand Prix of Figure Skating, a senior-level international invitational competition series. It was held at the Beijing Capital Gymnasium in Beijing on November 5–9. Medals were awarded in the disciplines of men's singles, ladies' singles, pair skating, and ice dancing. Skaters earned points toward qualifying for the 2008–09 Grand Prix Final. The compulsory dance was the Viennese Waltz.

Results

Men

Ladies

Pairs

Ice dancing

External links
 Chinese Skating Association
 Official site
 
 
 
 
 
 

Cup Of China, 2008
Cup of China
Sports competitions in Beijing
2000s in Beijing
Cup